Peter Polin (March 25, 1832November 7, 1870) was a Swiss American immigrant, merchant, and Republican politician.  He died the day before his election to the Wisconsin State Assembly.

Biography

Born in Zillis, Switzerland, Polin emigrated to the United States and settled in Dubuque, Iowa, and then moved to Alma, Buffalo County, Wisconsin, in 1857. Polin was a merchant. He served as postmaster of Alma, Wisconsin, and as Buffalo County Treasurer from 1862 to 1864. Polin was a Republican. In the Wisconsin General Election of November 8, 1870, Polin ran for the Wisconsin State Assembly against John Burt. However, on November 7, 1870, the day before election day, Polin died suddenly. However, most voters were not aware of his death and elected Polin to the Wisconsin Assembly with 444 votes to 370 for John Burt (Democrat) and 50 votes for Augustus F. Finkelnburg (Republican). Because there was no choice for the Wisconsin Assembly seat, Wisconsin Acting Governor Thaddeus Pound ordered a special election for December 31, 1870. In the December 31, 1870, Wisconsin Assembly special election Ahaz F. Allen (Republican) won the Wisconsin Assembly seat with 529 votes to 431 votes for James Burt (Democrat) and 172 votes for James L. Hallock (Independent).

References

External links

1832 births
1870 deaths
Swiss emigrants to the United States
People from Alma, Wisconsin
Businesspeople from Wisconsin
Republican Party members of the Wisconsin State Assembly
Wisconsin postmasters
19th-century American politicians
19th-century American businesspeople